The final phase of the 2002–03 UEFA Cup began on 26 November 2002 with the first matches of the third round and concluded on 21 May 2003 with the final at the Estadio Olímpico in Seville, Spain. A total of 32 teams competed in this phase of the competition.
 
Times up to 30 March 2003 (quarter-finals) were CET (UTC+1), and thereafter (semi-finals and final) CEST (UTC+2).

Round and draw dates
The draw for the third round was held in Geneva, while the remaining draws were held at UEFA headquarters in Nyon, Switzerland.

Format
Apart from the final, each tie was played over two legs, with each team playing one leg at home. The team that scored more goals on aggregate over the two legs advanced to the next round. If the aggregate score was level, the away goals rule was applied, i.e., the team that scored more goals away from home over the two legs advanced. If away goals were also equal, then thirty minutes of extra time (two fifteen-minute periods) was played. The away goals rule was again applied after extra time, i.e., if there were goals scored during extra time and the aggregate score was still level, the visiting team advanced by virtue of more away goals scored. If no goals were scored during extra time, the tie was decided by penalty shoot-out.

In the final, which was played as a single match, if scores were level at the end of normal time, extra time was played. If, on completion of the first period of extra time, one of the teams had scored more goals than the other, the silver goal rule was applied, i.e., the match ended and that team was declared the winner. If no decisive goal was scored, the second period of the extra time was played, followed by a penalty shoot-out if scores remained tied.

The mechanism of the draws for each round was as follows:
In the draws the third and fourth rounds, teams were seeded and divided into groups containing an equal number of seeded and unseeded teams. In each group, the seeded teams were drawn against the unseeded teams, with the first team drawn hosting the first leg. Teams from the same association could not be drawn against each other.
In the draws for the quarter-finals onwards, there were no seedings and teams from the same association could be drawn against each other.

Qualified teams
The final phase involved 32 teams: the 24 teams which qualified from the second round, and the eight third-placed teams from the Champions League group stage.

Bracket

Third round

Seeding
The 32 teams were distributed into two groups of eight teams, each containing four seeded and four unseeded teams. The draw was held on 15 November 2002 in Geneva, Switzerland.

Matches
The first leg was played on 26 and 28 November, and the second leg was played on 10 and 12 December 2002.

|}

First leg

Second leg

Wisła Kraków won 5–2 on aggregate.

Panathinaikos won 3–2 on aggregate.

Denizlispor won 1–0 on aggregate.

Hertha BSC won 2–1 on aggregate.

Beşiktaş won 3–1 on aggregate.

Auxerre won 2–1 on aggregate.

Lazio won 3–2 on aggregate.

Stuttgart won 3–1 on aggregate.

Anderlecht won 4–2 on aggregate.

Slavia Prague won 4–1 on aggregate.

AEK Athens won 8–1 on aggregate.

Liverpool won 2–0 on aggregate.

Málaga won 2–1 on aggregate.

2–2 on aggregate. Celtic won on away goals.

Porto won 3–1 on aggregate.

2–2 on aggregate. Boavista won on away goals.

Fourth round

Seeding
The 16 teams were distributed into two groups of eight teams, each containing four seeded and four unseeded teams. The draw was held on 13 December 2002 in Nyon, Switzerland.

Matches
The first leg was played on 20 February, and the second leg was played on 27 February 2003.

|}

First leg

Second leg

Beşiktaş wins 4–3 on aggregate.

Málaga won 1–0 on aggregate.

Celtic won 5–4 on aggregate.

Porto won 8–3 on aggregate.

Panathinaikos won 3–2 on aggregate.

Liverpool won 3–0 on aggregate.

3–3 on aggregate. Boavista won on away goals.

Lazio won 5–4 on aggregate.

Quarter-finals
The draw was held on 13 December 2002 in Nyon, Switzerland. The first leg was played on 13 March, and the second leg was played on 20 March 2003.

|}

First leg

Second leg

Porto won 2–1 on aggregate.

Lazio won 3–1 on aggregate.

Celtic won 3–1 on aggregate.

1–1 on aggregate. Boavista won 4–1 on penalties.

Semi-finals
The draw was held on 21 March 2003 in Nyon, Switzerland. The first leg was played on 10 April, and the second leg was played on 24 April 2003.

|}

First leg

Second leg

Porto won 4–1 on aggregate.

Celtic won 2–1 on aggregate.

Final

References

Final phase